Zéta is a Hungarian wine grape, a crossing of Furmint and Bouvier. It was introduced to the Tokaj-Hegyalja wine region of Hungary in 1951 and authorized for production in 1990. Previously known as Oremus, its name was changed to Zéta in 1999. Its main asset is a particular aptitude for high sugar concentrations, early ripening and susceptibility for botrytis. 

As Oremus, it was used in the production of Tokaji wines.

References 

White wine grape varieties
Grape varieties of Hungary